Jonathan Richmond (July 31, 1774 – July 28, 1853) was a U.S. Representative from New York.

Born in Dartmouth, Massachusetts, Richmond completed preparatory studies and moved to western New York in 1813, settling in Aurora, Cayuga County, New York. He was the Sheriff of Cayuga County, New York, from 1808 to 1812, and also worked as a United States internal revenue collector.

Richmond was elected as a Democratic-Republican to the Sixteenth Congress (March 4, 1819 – March 3, 1821).

He died in Aurora, New York, July 28, 1853, and was interred in Aurora Cemetery.

Sources

External links

 

1774 births
1853 deaths
People from Dartmouth, Massachusetts
People from Aurora, Cayuga County, New York
Democratic-Republican Party members of the United States House of Representatives from New York (state)